Soul Boy is a 2010 Kenyan drama film, written by Billy Kahora and directed by Hawa Essuman. It developed under the mentorship of German director and producer Tom Tykwer in Kibera, one of the largest slums in the African continent, in the middle of Nairobi, Kenya. The film has received five nominations at the 2011 African Movie Academy Awards.

The film originated in a workshop for young film enthusiasts from Nairobi, guided by German director Tom Tykwer.

Plot 
Nairobi, Kenya. 14-year-old Abila lives with his parents in Kibera, one of the largest slums in East Africa. One morning the teenager discovers his father ill and delirious. Someone has stolen his soul, mumbles the father. Abila is shocked and confused but wants to help his father and goes in search of the right remedy. Supported by his girlfriend Shiku, he embarks on an adventurous journey that leads him right to the heart of the microcosm that is his hometown.

Cast 
Samson Odhiambo
Leila Dayan Opou
Krysteen Savane
Frank Kimani
Joab Ogolla
Lucy Gachanja
Katherine Damaris
Kevin Onyango Omondi
Calvin Shikuku Odhiambo
Nordeen Abdulghani

Awards 
Dioraphte Audience Award, International Film Festival Rotterdam
Veto Award, Afrika-Filmfestival, Leuven, Belgium
Signis Award, Zanzibar International Film Festival, Zanzibar, Tanzania
Polish Filmmakers Association Award, Ale Kino!, Poznań, Poland
Best Short Film, Kalasha Awards, Nairobi, Kenya
Best Lead Actor: Samson Odhiambo, Kalasha Awards, Nairobi, Kenya
Best Scriptwriter: Billy Kahora, Kalasha Awards, Nairobi, Kenya
Best Actor: Samson Odhiambo, Kenya International Film Festival, Nairobi, Kenya
Best East African Film, Kenya International Film Festival, Nairobi, Kenya
Special Mention "Passeurs d’images" prize, FESTIVAL CINÉ JUNIOR (International Film Festival for Young people), Paris, France
The Young Jury Prize, FESTIVAL CINÉ JUNIOR (International Film Festival for Young people), Paris, France
Spiritual Film Festival Award, Paris
Best Children's Film Award at the Film Festival Recklinghausen (Germany) 2011
Best Editor: Ephantus Ng'ethe Gitungo, African Movie Academy Awards

Festivals

Germany 
2010: Berlin International Film Festival (Berlinale)

International 
2010
2010: Gothenburg Film Festival
2010: International Film Festival Rotterdam
2010: Afrika-Filmfestival
2010 Edinburgh International Film Festival
2010 Durban International Film Festival
2010 Sydney Film Festival
2010 Cinemafrica Stockholm
2010 Nairobi, Kenya Premiere
2010 African Film Festival Tarifa
2010 Sydney Film Festival
2010 Festival du Cinéma Africain de Khouribga
2010 Seoul Intl Youth Film Festival
2010 Montreal World Film Festival
2010 Cinemas D'Afrique
2010 Cambridge Film Festival
2010 Montreal Intl Black Film Festival
2010 Films From the South OSLO
2010 Hamptons Intl Film Festival
2010 Warsaw Film Festival
2010 Carlow African Film Festival
2010 Discovery Film Festival
2010 Chicago Intl Children's Film Festival
2010 Carthage Film Festival
2010 African Diaspora Film Festival NY
2010 Palm Springs Film Festival
2010 San Diego Black Film Festival
2010 Adelaide Film Festival
2010 FESPACO, Burkina Faso
2010 Birds Eye View FF
2010 FEBIOFEST
2010 Toronto IFF for children
2010 ReelWorld Film Festival
2010 Ecrans Noirs - Cameroun
2010 Rwanda Film Festival
2010 Zanzibar Film Festival, Tanzania
2010 Zimbabwe International Film Festival
2010 Kenya International Film Festival
2010 Amakula Kampala International FilmFestival, Uganda
2010 Ethiopia Film Festival
2010 Festival du film de Dakar, Senegal
2010 Quintessence, Benin

2011
 Cinema Le Bretagne (France)
 Plein La Bobine (France)
 Addis Film Festival (Ethiopia)
 Chennai Women In Films Festival (India)
 Fiuggi Family Festival (Italy)
 Salaam Festival (Denmark)
 Cine Sparks Festival (Australia)

Reception

Critical response 
Andrew Onyango reviewing for KenyaBuzz was mesmerized by how much "surreal" the world of the movie is, adding that the scripts use of Swahili strengthened the film's impact: "The Swahili speaking audience (particularly those exposed to the dialect being used) feel a powerful sense of identification. There is nothing like hearing it firsthand because the translation loses some of the impact of the words."

References

External links 
 
 
Soul Boy at Rushlake Media
Soul Boy, Filmportal.de 
article about Soul Boy
Interview with Tom Tykwer
Filmreporter

2010 films
Swahili-language films
Films set in Kenya
Best Editing Africa Movie Academy Award winners
Kenyan drama films